The Bang Bang Club is a 2010 Canadian-South African biographical drama film written and directed by Steven Silver and stars Ryan Phillippe as Greg Marinovich, Malin Åkerman as Robin Comley, Taylor Kitsch as Kevin Carter, Frank Rautenbach as Ken Oosterbroek and Neels Van Jaarsveld as João Silva. They portray the lives of four photojournalists active within the townships of South Africa during the apartheid period, particularly between 1990 and 1994, from when Nelson Mandela was released from prison to the 1994 elections.

It is a film adaptation of the book The Bang-Bang Club: Snapshots from a Hidden War co-written by Greg Marinovich and João Silva who were part of the group of four photographers known as the Bang-Bang Club, the other two members being Kevin Carter and Ken Oosterbroek.

Plot
The film tells the story of four young men and the extremes they went to in order to capture their pictures in the days prior to the downfall of apartheid in South Africa.

Cast
The Bang-Bang Club members
 Ryan Phillippe as Greg Marinovich
 Malin Åkerman as Robin Comley
 Taylor Kitsch as Kevin Carter
 Frank Rautenbach as Ken Oosterbroek
 Neels Van Jaarsveld as João Silva

Other roles
 Patrick Lyster as James Nachtwey
 Russel Savadier as Ronald Graham
 Alf Kumalo as himself

Distribution
The film had its world premiere at the Toronto International Film Festival (TIFF). Entertainment One has distribution rights for Canada. Tribeca Film acquired American distribution rights. It was released theatrically in the United States on 22 April 2011. According to The Numbers, the film was only shown in nine theatres in the US where it earned $124,791.

Reception
Judith Matloff, a veteran foreign correspondent and contributing editor at Columbia Journalism Review said in her review of the film that it is "the latest Hollywood production to get the role of the conflict correspondent wrong". Matloff wrote: "But the reporters and photographers stationed in South Africa at the time were also compassionate human beings who exposed themselves to danger because they wanted to record history. This doesn't particularly come through in the film. Instead, Silver plays to the Hollywood stereotype of journalists as heartless outsiders. After a fun day taking pictures of black people massacring each other, the lads go back to the white suburbs and party — the implication being that the bloodshed is a game to them."

Matloff worked with Marinovich and knew Silva, as she was a member of the Johannesburg press corps in the early 1990s. She wrote in her article for the Columbia Journalism Review of her experiences, "The film depicts the photographers as reckless thrill-seekers, swaggering into newsrooms like rock stars and canoodling with babes, when not jumping into cars to chase 'Bang Bang' (violence)". In her review Matloff said that Marinovich had disassociated himself from the film version. "It has the same title but it is not the same story. It's not my life. I don't see the character as me."

Miriam Brent in her review for The Guardian said "Frustratingly, though, while the film poses pertinent questions about when to put the camera down, it shies away from delving deeper into these moral dilemmas and the emotional strain faced by combat photographers. Instead we're introduced to a testosterone-fuelled world in which dodging bullets is just another way of getting kicks before the partying starts. … It's just a shame the accomplished cinematography isn't matched by a script that lets the true bravery and accomplishments of combat photojournalists shine through, as they deserve."

The Bang Bang Club received mixed reviews. , it holds a 49% rating on Rotten Tomatoes based on 47 reviews, with an average rating of 5.89/10.

References

External links
 
 
 

Bang-Bang Club
2010 films
Canadian biographical drama films
South African biographical drama films
2010s English-language films
English-language South African films
English-language Canadian films
Zulu-language films
Xhosa-language films
Afrikaans-language films
2010 biographical drama films
Apartheid films
Films based on non-fiction books
Drama films based on actual events
Films set in 1994
Films set in South Africa
Films shot in South Africa
2010 drama films
Biographical films about photographers
Films about photojournalists
Biographical films about photojournalists
2010s Canadian films